This page refers to the orders, decorations, and medals of Tonga.

Royal Orders

See also

 List of honours of Tonga awarded to heads of state and royalty

 Tongan nobles

References 

 
Tonga and the Commonwealth of Nations